The Palace of Justice houses the Malaysian Court of Appeal and Federal Court, which moved to Putrajaya from the Sultan Abdul Samad Building in Kuala Lumpur in 2003.

History 

Due to the need for a proper office of the head of the judicial system in Malaysia, a location within the Precinct 3 of Putrajaya was identified for this purpose. aQidea Architect was commissioned to design the building after finishing the nearby Prime Minister's Office. The building houses two Federal Courts, six Courts of Appeal, the Chief Registrar's Office, two registries for the Federal Court, the Court of Appeal (as required under Articles 121(1B) and 121(2)), a conference hall, a library, and a museum. The complex has an intricate network of passages which segregate the judges, witnesses, public, and the accused leading to the courts from the car park or area of arrival. 

The design is about bringing about "order" and order is the theme of the day as the layouts are fashioned in an orderly manner. AR Ahmad Rozi Abd Wahab, the principal architect was personally responsible for the design layout and coming out with the architectural concept and ideas.

Architecture 

The Palace of Justice's design incorporates influences of Classical Islamic culture like Taj Mahal in India, Moorish culture, like the Sultan Abdul Samad Building in Kuala Lumpur and Western Classical influence, like Palladian. The classical design gives depths to the building skin and creates interesting articulated facade.

The complex comprises a five-storey building for the judiciary and a two-storey building to house the courts and offices.

Interior 
There is a large central atrium (Rotunda) around which the various rooms are arranged. The atrium helps to guide visitors who had just arrived into the building and has clear visual connection to the other floors above.

The Library is located on the Ground floor adjacent to the entrance door, with the hearing rooms of both the Federal and Appeal Courts located on the first floor. The Registries and offices of the Appeal and Federal Courts are on the second and third floors respectively. The Judges chambers of the Appeal and Federal Court are located on the fourth and fifth floor.

The locations of these functions are designed on designated levels to ensure privacy and security. Even the location of car parking are segregated between the judges, the staffs and the public. The arrival point for people driving their cars to the Palace of Justice are carefully scrutinised to ensure safety, security and privacy. The layout is designed to have direct access for judges to go to their respective chambers from their car park. Public spaces are designed to certain secured zones only.

See also 
 Kuala Lumpur Courts Complex

References 

Buildings and structures in Putrajaya
Courthouses in Malaysia
Tourist attractions in Putrajaya
2004 establishments in Malaysia